The Rio Cachoeira is a river in the state of Santa Catarina in Brazil. The river empties into the Baía de Babitonga, a bay connected with the Atlantic Ocean. It flows through the city Joinville. 

Rivers of Santa Catarina (state)